Davvas (in Persian : دواس) is a district in Bushehr which is located near the Persian Gulf. Its inhabitants are mostly those migrating from other cities and towns near Bushehr including, Borazjan, Khormooj, Ahram, etc.

The famous State-run university in Bushehr called Persian Gulf University is near this district of Bushehr.

Sadeq Chubak, the leading Iranian short story writer who is originally from Bushehr, set the setting of his best novel called Tangsir in this district of Bushehr. This story is representative of how a 'Tangsir' rebels against his governor in an attempt to get his money back. This legendary story is still recited by the people in Bushehr.

Populated places in Bushehr Province